This is a list of converts to Sikhism from Hinduism.

 Banda Bahadur (formerly Madho Das) - affectionately known within the Sikh tradition as 'the first monarch of the Sikh Kingdom'; is said to have received Sikh baptism by the hand of the tenth guru of the Sikhs, Guru Gobind Singh
 Bhai Bala - supposed childhood friend and all his life a constant companion of Bhai Mardana and Guru Nanak.  
 Bhai Dayala - accompanied Guru Tegh Bahadur in martyrdom at Delhi. 
 Bhai Mati Das - accompanied Guru Tegh Bahadur in martyrdom at Delhi. 
 Bhai Sati Das - accompanied Guru Tegh Bahadur in martyrdom at Delhi. 
Ezhava Sikhs - during the Vaikom Satyagraha, some Ezhava youth were attracted to the concepts of the Sikhism and as a result, joined the religion.
 Panj Piare (Punjabi: ਪੰਜ ਪਿਆਰੇ, Pañj Pi'ārē, literally the five beloved ones) - name given to the five Sikhs, Bhai Daya Singh, Bhai Dharam Singh, Bhai Himmat Singh, Bhai Mohkam Singh and Bhai Sahib Singh, who were so designated by Guru Gobind Singh at the historic congregation at Anandpur Sahib on 30 March 1699.  
 Bhagat Puran Singh (1904–1992) - great visionary; accomplished environmentalist; founder of the "All India Pingalwara Charitable Society; being deeply influenced by the teachings of Sri Guru Granth Sahib, he converted to Sikhism.  
 Sahib Singh - renowned Sikh academic who made a tremendous contribution to Sikh literature.  
 Master Tara Singh - prominent Sikh political and religious leader in the first half of the 20th century
Teja Singh - active member of the Singh Sabha movement

References

Sikhism from Hinduism
Converts to Sikhism from Hinduism